Daizy Gedeon (born 1965) is an Australian-Lebanese journalist and filmmaker.

Biography 
Gedeon was born in Kousba, Lebanon in 1965. Her family immigrated to Australia when she was five years old. She began her writing career as a sports writer in 1987 and was the first female sports journalist on The Australian newspaper and the first female football writer in Australia which led her to the 1988 Olympic Games in Seoul. After several years of covering sports, Daizy started to cover foreign affairs, particularly those in the Middle East. She interviewed Yasser Arafat at the 1990 Arab Summit in Baghdad and covered the Lebanon War as a correspondent for publications including The Times.

Film career 
In 1996, Gedeon released her first feature documentary film, Lebanon... Imprisoned Splendour, starring Omar Sharif. The documentary qualified for the 1998 Academy Awards for Best Feature Documentary and won several international accolades including the Silver Screen Award at the US International Film and Video Festival and the Best of the Shorts at the Boston Film Festival.

In 2021, the filmmaker was presented with the Movie That Matters Award at a Better World Fund (BWF) gala event in Cannes for her documentary film Enough! Lebanon's Darkest Hour.

Filmography

References 

Lebanese Australian
Lebanese film directors
Lebanese film producers
Australian film directors
Australian journalists
1965 births
Living people